Christ the King Parish - designated for Polish immigrants in Ludlow, Massachusetts, United States.

 Founded 1948. It is one of the Polish-American Roman Catholic parishes in New England in the Diocese of Springfield in Massachusetts. The architect of the 1940 church was Anthony J. DePace of New York who designed more than 30 buildings for catholic clients during the middle years of the 20th century.

Mass Schedule 
Sunday
 7:30 AM
 8:45 AM (Polish)
 10:00 AM
 11:15 AM
 5:30 PM
Monday, Wednesday, Thursday & Friday
 7:00 AM
 7:30 AM
Tuesday
 7:00 AM
 6:00 PM (Miraculous Medal Novena Mass)
Saturday
 7:00 AM
 7:30 AM
 5:00 PM (Sunday Vigil)
 6:30 PM (Sunday Vigil)

Bibliography 
 
 The Official Catholic Directory in USA

External links 
 Christ the King - Diocesan information
 Christ the King - ParishesOnline.com
 Christ the King - TheCatholicDirectory.com 
 Diocese of Springfield in Massachusetts

Roman Catholic parishes of Diocese of Springfield in Massachusetts
Polish-American Roman Catholic parishes in Massachusetts
Ludlow, Massachusetts